A bombilla (Spanish), bomba (Portuguese) or massasa (Arabic) is a type of drinking straw, used to drink mate.
In metal bombillas, the lower end is perforated and acts as a metal filter which is used to separate the mate infusion from leaves, stems, and other mate debris, and functions in a similar fashion to the perforated metal screen of a teapot. Filters can be removable and can be opened for cleaning, or they may be permanently fixed to the bombilla stem.

Traditional bombillas are made of metal alloys such as an alloy of copper and nickel called alpaca silver or German silver, stainless steel, and 800 silver which is used to construct the filter and stem, sometimes combined with a gold plated head. Low-end bombillas are made from hollow-stemmed cane. Silver bombillas are popular. In recent times, the traditional silver bombillas are being replaced by ones made from stainless steel.

Silver bombillas were used by the privileged classes, while those made of straw were used by people of lesser means. Due to the high thermal conductivity of silver, bombillas and gourds made of silver can get very hot fast, requiring caution when drinking hot mate tea to avoid burns.

Etymology
The Spanish name "Bombilla" means literally "little pump". The Spanish term is also used for electric lightbulbs, bombilla eléctrica, being a diminutive of bomba.

Gallery

References

Yerba mate